The 1937–38 Egypt Cup was the 16th edition of the Egypt Cup.

The final was held on 14 May 1938. The match was contested by Al Ahly and Zamalek, with the first match ended in a 1–1 draw, a replay was played on 2 December 1938 which Zamalek won 1–0.

Quarter-finals 

|}
Replays

|}

Semi-finals 

|}

Final

Replay

References 

 

3
Egypt Cup
1937–38 in Egyptian football